The 1921 VMI Keydets football team was an American football team that represented the Virginia Military Institute (VMI) during the 1921 college football season as a  member of the South Atlantic Intercollegiate Athletic Association. In their second year under head coach Blandy Clarkson, the team compiled an overall record of 3–5–1.

Schedule

References

VMI Keydets
VMI Keydets football seasons
VMI Keydets football